Souls on the Coast (Spanish:Almas de la costa) is a 1923 Uruguayan silent drama film directed by Juan Antonio Borges and starring Luisa von Thielmann, Remigio Guichón and Arturo Scognamiglio.

Cast
 Luisa von Thielmann 
 Remigio Guichón   
 Arturo Scognamiglio
 Carlos Russi  
 Judith Acosta y Lara
 Miguel Cristi   
 Norma del Campo

References

Bibliography 
 Rist, Peter H. Historical Dictionary of South American Cinema. Rowman & Littlefield, 2014.

External links 
 

1923 films
1923 drama films
Uruguayan drama films
Uruguayan silent films
1920s Spanish-language films
Uruguayan black-and-white films
Films set in Montevideo
Films shot in Montevideo
Silent drama films